is a former Japanese football player.

Club statistics

References

External links

1989 births
Living people
Association football people from Gifu Prefecture
Japanese footballers
J2 League players
Japan Football League players
FC Gifu players
FC Kariya players
Association football forwards